A by-election was held for the New South Wales Legislative Assembly electorate of Orange on 28 June 1862 because John Peisley resigned. Piesley had rarely attended the Legislative Assembly and a public meeting in Orange called on him to attend to his parliamentary duties or resign. Piesley's letter of resignation stated that he had been unable to attend to his parliamentary duties due to the pressure of business.

Dates

Results

John Peisley resigned.

See also
Electoral results for the district of Orange
List of New South Wales state by-elections

References

1862 elections in Australia
New South Wales state by-elections
1860s in New South Wales